The Lower Murray languages form a branch of the Pama–Nyungan family. They are:

Ngarinyeri (Yaralde, Yaraldi, Ngarrindjeri, Ramindjeri)
Ngayawung (Ngayawang) (†)
Yuyu (Ngintait, Ngarkat) (†)
Keramin (†)
Yitha-Yitha moribund

Dixon treats these as isolates, either because they are not close or are too poorly attested to demonstrate they are close. Bowern (2011) adds Peramangk.

References